Virbia punctata is a moth in the family Erebidae first described by Herbert Druce in 1911. It is found in Colombia.

References

punctata
Moths described in 1911